Garry Baker (born 24 March 1953) is a former Australian rules footballer who played for Melbourne, Footscray and Sydney in the Victorian Football League (VFL).

A ruckman, Baker was originally from Meeniyan and started his career at Footscray before moving to Melbourne where he played most of his football. 

He won Melbourne's best and fairest in 1978 but struggled in the subsequent seasons due to a knee injury. 

In 1983 he joined Sydney who were playing just their second season in the city but he only managed six games. 

He later played for and coached both Mordialloc and Moorabbin in the Victorian Football Association.

Playing statistics

|- style="background-color: #EAEAEA"
! scope="row" style="text-align:center" | 1972
|style="text-align:center;"|
| 27 || 1 || 0 || 0 || 3 || 2 || 5 || 1 ||  || 0.0 || 0.0 || 3.0 || 2.0 || 5.0 || 1.0 || 
|-
! scope="row" style="text-align:center" | 1973
|style="text-align:center;"|
| 27 || 13 || 9 || 6 || 77 || 22 || 99 || 41 ||  || 0.7 || 0.5 || 5.9 || 1.7 || 7.6 || 3.2 || 
|- style="background:#eaeaea;"
! scope="row" style="text-align:center" | 1974
|style="text-align:center;"|
| 1 || 20 || 24 || 9 || 201 || 59 || 260 || 116 ||  || 1.2 || 0.5 || 10.1 || 3.0 || 13.0 || 5.8 || 
|-
! scope="row" style="text-align:center" | 1975
|style="text-align:center;"|
| 1 || 16 || 15 || 9 || 95 || 33 || 128 || 47 ||  || 0.9 || 0.6 || 6.3 || 2.2 || 8.5 || 3.1 || 
|- style="background:#eaeaea;"
! scope="row" style="text-align:center" | 1976
|style="text-align:center;"|
| 1 || 8 || 9 || 5 || 51 || 20 || 71 || 39 ||  || 1.1 || 0.6 || 6.4 || 2.5 || 8.9 || 4.9 || 
|-
! scope="row" style="text-align:center" | 1977
|style="text-align:center;"|
| 1 || 17 || 18 || 9 || 131 || 65 || 196 || 85 ||  || 1.1 || 0.6 || 7.7 || 3.8 || 11.5 || 5.0 || 
|- style="background:#eaeaea;"
! scope="row" style="text-align:center" | 1978
|style="text-align:center;"|
| 1 || 22 || 12 || 5 || 254 || 107 || 361 || 179 ||  || 0.5 || 0.3 || 11.5 || 4.9 || 16.4 || 8.1 || 
|-
! scope="row" style="text-align:center" | 1979
|style="text-align:center;"|
| 1 || 16 || 11 || 5 || 167 || 120 || 287 || 120 ||  || 0.7 || 0.3 || 10.4 || 7.5 || 17.9 || 7.5 || 
|- style="background:#eaeaea;"
! scope="row" style="text-align:center" | 1980
|style="text-align:center;"|
| 1 || 16 || 23 || 11 || 116 || 122 || 238 || 87 ||  || 1.4 || 0.7 || 7.3 || 7.6 || 14.9 || 5.4 || 
|-
! scope="row" style="text-align:center" | 1981
|style="text-align:center;"|
| 1 || 12 || 0 || 0 || 104 || 97 || 201 || 82 ||  || 0.0 || 0.0 || 8.7 || 8.1 || 16.8 || 6.8 || 
|- style="background:#eaeaea;"
! scope="row" style="text-align:center" | 1982
|style="text-align:center;"|
| 1 || 6 || 5 || 4 || 22 || 10 || 32 || 13 ||  || 0.8 || 0.7 || 3.7 || 1.7 || 5.3 || 2.2 || 
|- class="sortbottom"
! colspan=3| Career
! 147
! 126
! 63
! 1221
! 657
! 1878
! 810
! 
! 0.9
! 0.4
! 8.4
! 4.5
! 12.9
! 5.5
! 
|}

References

External links

DemonWiki profile

1953 births
Living people
Australian rules footballers from Victoria (Australia)
Western Bulldogs players
Melbourne Football Club players
Sydney Swans players
Keith 'Bluey' Truscott Trophy winners
Mordialloc Football Club players
Moorabbin Football Club players
Moorabbin Football Club coaches
Mordialloc Football Club coaches
Sandy Bay Football Club players